Warth may refer to:

Places
Warth, Lower Austria, Austria
Warth, Vorarlberg, Austria
Warth-Weiningen, Switzerland

Other uses
Brother Warth, a fictional character in the Blue Lantern Corps